Anemone hepatica (syn. Hepatica nobilis), the common hepatica, liverwort, kidneywort, or pennywort, is a species of flowering plant in the buttercup family Ranunculaceae, native to woodland in temperate regions of the Northern Hemisphere. This herbaceous perennial grows from a rhizome.

Description

Leaves and flowers emerge directly from the rhizome, not from a stem above ground.

The upper side is dark green with whitish stripes and the lower side is violet or reddish brown. Leaves emerge during or after flowering and remain green through winter.

The flowers are blue, purple, pink, or white and appear in winter or spring. They have five to ten oval showy sepals and three green bracts.

Taxonomy
The taxonomy of the genus Anemone and its species is not fully resolved, but phylogenetic studies of many species of Anemone and related genera indicate that species of the genus Hepatica should be included under Anemone because of similarities both in molecular attributes and other shared morphologies. The circumscription of the taxon is also debated, some authors listing the North American  var. acuta and var. obtusa, while other list them as the separate species A. acutiloba and A. americana, respectively.

Varieties
Varieties of Anemone hepatica that are sometimes recognized include:
 Anemone hepatica var. japonica, a synonym of Hepatica nobilis var. japonica , is native to the Russian Far East, China, Korea, and Japan
 Anemone hepatica var. acuta, a synonym of Hepatica acutiloba , is native to eastern North America
 Anemone hepatica var. obtusa, a synonym of Hepatica americana , is native to eastern North America

Distribution and habitat
It is found in woods, thickets and meadows, especially in the mountains of continental Europe, North America and Japan.

Ecology
Hepatica flowers produce pollen but no nectar. In North America, the flowers first attract Lasioglossum sweat bees and small carpenter bees looking in vain for nectar. Then when the stamens begin to release pollen, the bees return to collect and feed on pollen. Mining bees sometimes visit the flowers, but prefer flowers that produce both nectar and pollen.

Toxicity
Like other Ranunculaceae, fresh liverwort contains protoanemonin and is therefore slightly toxic. By drying the herb, protoanemonin is dimerized to the non-toxic anemonin.

Uses
Medieval herbalists believed it could be used to treat liver diseases, and is still used in alternative medicine today. Other modern applications by herbalists include treatments for pimples, bronchitis and gout.

Under the name Hepatica nobilis, which is now regarded as a synonym, this plant has gained the Royal Horticultural Society's Award of Garden Merit.

Culture
It is the official flower of the Sweden Democrats political party in Swedish politics.

Gallery

References

External links
 
 Flora of Pennsylvania

hepatica
Medicinal plants of Europe
Medicinal plants of North America
Flora of Europe
Flora of Asia
Plants described in 1753
Taxa named by Carl Linnaeus
Flora of Eastern Canada
Flora of the Northeastern United States
Flora of the North-Central United States
Flora of the Southeastern United States
Flora without expected TNC conservation status